Lee Joo-hyun (Hangul: 이주현 ; also known as Johanna Lee ; born March 13, 1974, in Masan district, Changwon is a retired female badminton player originally from South Korea who later moved to play for United States. She won U.S. National Championships for 10 times.

Achievements

Asian Games 
Women's singles

Asian Championships 
Women's singles

East Asian Games 
Women's singles

IBF Grand Prix 
Women's singles

Women's doubles

IBF International 
Women's doubles

References 

South Korean female badminton players
Asian Games medalists in badminton
1974 births
Living people
Badminton players at the 1998 Asian Games
Asian Games silver medalists for South Korea
Asian Games bronze medalists for South Korea
Medalists at the 1998 Asian Games
People from Changwon
Sportspeople from South Gyeongsang Province